Dmitri Aleksandrovich Matviyenko (born 25 August 1989) is a former Russian professional footballer.

Club career
He played in the Russian Football National League for FC Zvezda Irkutsk in 2008.

External links
 
 
 

1989 births
Living people
Russian footballers
Association football defenders
FC Zvezda Irkutsk players
FC Tom Tomsk players
FC Baikal Irkutsk players